Charles Caldwell (1830 or 1831 – December 25, 1875) was a Reconstruction era political and state militia leader in Mississippi. He held office as a state senator and county commissioner before being assassinated in 1875.

A former slave, he was a delegate to Mississippi's 1868 Constitutional Convention. He worked as a blacksmith in Clinton, Mississippi, a small town about 12 miles from Jackson in Hinds County, Mississippi.

Political violence in Clinton included the Clinton Riot after a political rally of African Americans. Governor Adelbert Ames authorized a militia in response and put Caldwell in charge of it in Clinton but later backed down and disbanded it.

The U.S. Congress reported on election violence and Caldwell's assassination. A plaque commemorates his life.

See also
 African-American officeholders during and following the Reconstruction era

References

Further reading
 Steven J. Niven, “Caldwell, Charles”. African American National Biography, edited by Henry Louis Gates Jr., Oxford African American Studies Center

External links
 His life is retold in the radio drama "The Story of 1875", a presentation from Destination Freedom

1875 deaths
African-American politicians during the Reconstruction Era
Mississippi state senators
Year of birth missing
People from Clinton, Massachusetts
19th-century American politicians
American blacksmiths
1830s births
African-American state legislators in Mississippi
American freedmen